Alexandru Nagy (born 28 October 1946 – 1992) was a Romanian professional footballer of Hungarian ethnicity. Nagy grew up in the youth academies of Crișana Oradea and Crișul Oradea, making its debut in the top-flight for Crișul, in 1965. He played in approx. 133 matches for Crișul (64 in the Divizia A), then in 1972 moved to Jiul Petroșani, where also arrived his former teammate, Árpád Szűcs (via Mureșul Deva).

Jiul won 1974 Cupa României with Nagy as an essential player, together with other important names of the Romanian football, such as Petre Libardi, Árpád Szűcs, Gheorghe Mulțescu, Adalbert Rozsnyai or Mihai Stoichiță. Nagy would play with Jiul the only two european matches in the history of the club, a two-legged encounter against Dundee United, during the 1974–75 European Cup Winners' Cup season.

In 1975, Nagy moved back to Crișul Oradea, now renamed as FC Bihor Oradea, where he spent two more seasons in the top-flight, playing in approx. 60 matches. Nagy retired in 1977, after 13 seasons of football, 192 matches in the top-flight and 9 goals.

Honours
Bihor Oradea
Divizia B: 1970–71

Jiul Petroșani
Cupa României: 1973–74

References

External links

Alexandru Nagy at labtof.ro
Alexandru Nagy at uefa.com

1946 births
Date of death missing
Sportspeople from Oradea
Romanian footballers
Association football midfielders
Liga I players
Liga II players
CA Oradea players
FC Bihor Oradea players
CSM Jiul Petroșani players